The 2020 Maine Black Bears football team represented the University of Maine in the 2020–21 NCAA Division I FCS football season. They played their home games at Alfond Stadium. They were a member of the Colonial Athletic Association. They were led by second-year head coach Nick Charlton.

On July 17, 2020, the Colonial Athletic Association announced that it would not play fall sports due to the COVID-19 pandemic. However, the conference is allowing the option for teams to play as independents for the 2020 season if they still wish to play in the fall.

Previous season
The Black Bears finished the 2019 season 6–6, 4–4 in CAA play to finish in a four-way tie for fifth place.

Schedule
The CAA released its spring conference schedule on October 27, 2020.

References

Maine
Maine Black Bears football seasons
Maine Black Bears football